Peacehaven is a town and civil parish in the Lewes district of East Sussex, England. It is located above the chalk cliffs of the South Downs approximately six miles east of Brighton city centre, on the A259 road. Its site coincides with the point where the Greenwich meridian crosses the English south coast. Peacehaven is next to Telscombe Cliffs, a later western extension to Peacehaven, which lies within a separate parish and has a separate town council.

History
A Bronze Age barrow (burial mound) lies very close to the cliff top, which has been under investigation by local societies. The barrow represents evidence of the occupation of Peacehaven at least 3,500 years ago. A 2007 excavation of the new Bovis Homes site to the west of Peacehaven Community School's playing fields unearthed a large range of evidence for a prehistoric settlement throughout the Bronze and Iron Ages.

Peacehaven was established in 1916 by entrepreneur Charles Neville, who had purchased land in the parish of Piddinghoe; he then set up a company to develop the site (he also eventually built nearby towns Saltdean and parts of Rottingdean). He advertised it by setting up a competition in virtually every newspaper in England to name the development. The name of the winners who chose the name 'New Anzac-on-Sea' (to commemorate the ANZAC's involvement in the Battle of Gallipoli) were Mr West of Ilford, Essex and Mr Kemp of Maidstone, Kent.

The Daily Express later sued Neville over the competition, holding that it was a scam, since he was offering "free" plots of land in the town as runner-up prizes but issuing them only on the payment of a conveyancing fee. The Express won the case, but the publicity brought the scheme to a large audience. The idea was then to sell plots of land cheaply for people to build on themselves.

Initially the town was New Anzac-on-Sea but less than a year later, on 12 February 1917 it was renamed Peacehaven.

In 1927 the directors of Peacehaven Estates Ltd, of South Coast Road, Peacehaven, and 7, Pall Mall, Westminster, were Lord Teynham (Chairman), C. W. Neville (managing director), and G. Kay Green.

Although it has been claimed that the town was originally formed for retiring World War I veterans in order for them to escape and recover from the effects of the war, this is not proven. Mr Neville's publicity promoted the town as being an idyllic setting, sea air and simple lifestyle were thought to have aided good health. The land was also cheap and, as a result, working-class families from the city started to purchase plots and gradually build makeshift homes for weekends and holidays. This movement of frontier-style buildings made with whatever materials were available at the time was termed as the Plotlands movement. Inhabitants felt a sense of freedom in living off what they needed and enjoying a simpler life away from the busy, polluted city. The Plotlands provided the working class an opportunity that might not have been available otherwise.

By 1924 there were 3,000 people living in Peacehaven. Original houses were often very temporary affairs (some were old railway carriages). Others were constructed from former army huts, brought from North Camp near Seaford, a few of these still survive, having been given an outer concrete block wall (they can be identified by their oblong shape that tends to be end-on to the road). Eventually the local council invested in water and electrical services and so people started to build more substantial houses. After World War II, the local council introduced a zoning scheme in order to distinguish areas for improvement along the coast road. In 1974 the Town Centre Map and Action Plan was formed to aid development.

There are two listed farmsteads in the town: Halcombe Farm House built in the 17th century, and Hoddern Farm House from the 18th century. Another old building is the Shepherds Cot, now part of a private residential property in The Compts in north Peacehaven.  This tiny cabin dates from the 1880s when it was built on farmland to shelter shepherds during the lambing season.

The popular singer and comedian Gracie Fields bought a home in Peacehaven overlooking the sea, then established the Gracie Fields Home and Orphanage in Dorothy Avenue. In fact the children were not orphans; their parents were entertainers who placed their children there while they were on tour. It was administered by the Theatrical Ladies Guild. Dorothy House is now a care home for elderly people.

Geography
The pebble beach below the cliffs can be reached by a stairs and concrete driveway and sea walk. There are a number of green spaces along the A259 and the cliffs, one of which is called The Dell. A cinema formerly stood on this site, and now it holds events such as car boot sales, fireworks, fairgrounds, motorhome exhibitions, the Donkey Derby and an annual carnival (though in 2005 the carnival was held on the Joff field located behind the Meridian shopping centre). In the 1950s, the carnival stalls were located on the then vacant land on the NW corner of the South Coast Road (A259) and Dorothy Avenue.

Neville was influenced by the American grid system of planning. There were originally no "Streets" in Peacehaven; only "Roads" and "Avenues". With very few exceptions, "Roads" ran east to west, and "Avenues" north to south, most forming crossroads where they intersected the South Coast Road (A259). Apart from this road, Roderick Avenue, running roughly up the centre, was the only surfaced road (except for the area of Local Authority housing around Friars Avenue (north) in Peacehaven until the late 1950s, when the process of making-up the roads began. This started in Telscombe Cliffs and worked eastwards. As part of this, many of the Avenues had their junction with the main road blocked off to reduce the number of junctions and crossroads. The town still retains its original "grid" layout (apart from the newer development to the west called Telscombe Cliffs and above Firle Road): rectangular plots of land on both sides of the main road. Aerial photographs from the 30s clearly show the "grid" pattern and, at that time, the scattered nature of the community.

The parish includes part of the Brighton to Newhaven Cliffs Site of Special Scientific Interest. The cliffs are mainly of geological interest, containing many Santonian and Campanian fossils. The SSSI listing includes flora and fauna biological interest too.

It was unveiled on 10 August 1936, and has been relocated twice due to erosion of the cliffs.

Governance

Peacehaven's lowest tier of government is the Peacehaven Town Council who are responsible for local planning, highways and other amenities. The council consists of 17 elected councillors from three wards, North, West and East Peacehaven. The May 2007 election returned 17 Conservative Party councillors.

The next level of government is Lewes District Council with responsibilities for the wider ranging areas such as council tax collection, environmental health and democratic services. Peacehaven provides six councillors to the district council, representing the same three wards as the parish council. Election are held every four years, the May 2007 election returned six Conservative Party councillors.

The county council for East Sussex has responsibility for education, libraries, social services, civil registration, trading standards and transport. Elections for the county council are held every four years. Peacehaven parish is combined with the neighbouring Telscombe parish forming the Peacehaven & Telscombe Towns electoral division which elects two councillors to the council. The May 2013 election returned two UKIP councillors.
Peacehaven is in the Brighton Kemptown constituency for the UK parliamentary elections. In June 2017 Lloyd Russell-Moyle was elected Labour MP for the constituency.

Prior to Brexit in 2020, Peacehaven was represented by the South East region, in the European Parliament.

Economy, retail and services 

Peacehaven is twinned with the French town of Épinay-sous-Sénart and the German town of Isernhagen.

The Co-operative Meridian Shopping Centre has a Post Office, opticians, barber, café, stationery shop, phone shop, betting shop, and a library. There is a large community building within which PCT have their office and meeting/event rooms, including a theatre/cinema and a local community 'mini market' selling crafts, vegetables, stationery and collectables which opens Fridays and Saturdays. The area is also served by three other smaller Co-op, Sainsbury, and Tesco supermarkets. An antiques shop on the South Coast Road has featured in TV programmes, and there is also a large vintage furniture/restoration shop. The area also has several hairdressers, barbers and beauty parlours.

There is a leisure centre, three dentists, a GP practice and pharmacy at the purpose built Havens Health Centre and several pubs, coffee shops, cafés and restaurants located throughout the town. The popular Avenue Wine Bar offers various menus and hosts live music. A new Italian bistro is expected to open soon. There are a few fast food chain outlets: Costa, Subway, and Greggs, all on the South Coast Road. The RIBA award-winning Gateway Café in Centenary Park enjoys views over to the nearest Downs. An organic plants nursery, Louvain, can be found to the north of the town.

Charity shops include a local Housing/Homeless Project and the Martlets Hospice: the latter includes a donated furniture showroom.

Since the late 1990s the town  has become more popular with incomers including Londoners searching for somewhere quieter and with better domestic parking facilities than Brighton.

Religious buildings

There are four churches in Peacehaven and one in Telscombe Cliffs. The Church of the Ascension, build by L. Keir Hett to replace Peacehaven's Anglican church, replaced a temporary building which had been erected in 1922.  The Roman Catholic Church, dedicated to the Immaculate Conception, was also founded in a temporary building in the 1920s; this survives as the church hall of the present brick structure.  A Jehovah's Witnesses' Kingdom Hall and an Evangelical church are also in use. Telscombe Cliffs United Reformed Church serves the population of both communities.

Education
The town has one secondary school, Peacehaven Community School. There are also three primary schools: Peacehaven Heights Primary School,Meridian Primary School, and Telscombe Cliffs Primary School and Nursery. The library located in the Meridian Centre hosts various training talks for adults and educational activities for children, as well as hosting a regular citizens' advice bureau.

Sport and leisure
Peacehaven has a Non-League football club Peacehaven & Telscombe F.C. who play at the Sports Park. The club hosts a variety of football tournaments that range from age U10–U16 every summer. There is also a small leisure centre and a bowls club and dance schools such as Harlequin and Studio 54, as well as football and martial arts clubs.

Several special interest groups operate. The Women's Institute meets regularly at the Meridian Centre along with other community groups including a memory café, quiz, bingo and regular movie screenings in the small cinema there. Peacehaven Horticultural Society is popular and holds a Flower and Produce (and crafts) Show every year. Some members' gardens are open to visits in summer. A community orchard has been established within the Centenary Park near the football ground, as has an eco friendly children playground, within a huge area for public walks. Additionally a Community Garden has been established in the Oval Park, growing plants and vegetables with a volunteer group. The Peacehaven Players are a thriving amateur theatre group, a stamp collectors' club remains active, as do the bee keepers' association and the Pioneers local history group.

Peacehaven Food and Drink Festival with activities for children takes place in one of the largest parks every July, and there are regular boot sales on the Dell.

Delivered on 30 acres of land given over by Southern Water and funded by financial contributions from Southern Water and Bovis Homes a new community led recreation destination 'The Big Parks Project' was completed in 2015.  Designed by architects Kaner Olette and engineers HOP & Crofton Consulting, the project includes a central activity café, children’s playgrounds, new cycle paths, skate park, and sports facilities.  The project has received many accolades since it was completed, including Constructing Excellence Sustainability Award – Winner 2015; Architects Journal Retrofit Award – Winner 2015; RIBA South East Award – Winner 2016; Sussex Heritage Trust Public & Community – Highly Commended 2016.

Peacehaven in film and fiction
The town plays a part in Graham Greene's 1938 novel Brighton Rock.

The 1979 film Quadrophenia starring Phil Daniels in the leading role as a mod named Jimmy also ended up in Peacehaven. At the end of the film he finds out his idol, the suave mod "poster boy" Ace Face (played by Sting), is in reality a bellboy. He steals Ace's scooter and heads out to Peacehaven Cliffs and an uncertain fate.

Peacehaven was selected for the site at which a car is pushed over the cliff in the TV thriller series The Level, while earlier Tiffany Mitchell's ashes were portrayed to be cast over the cliffs, in the BBC soap EastEnders in 1999, with viewers having been told at her funeral that she had spent happy childhood holidays there.

Miodrag Kojadinović has a short story about a search for an ancestor in Peacehaven that plays with the concept of a "haven of peace", which won a prize for stories with Jewish themes and appeared in Serbian and Hungarian, both out of Novi Sad.

In April 2017, Peacehaven, under the name of "Meridian Cliffs", was the scene of a series of ten fifteen-minute Radio 4 short stories by Lynne Truss, with the overall title "Life at Absolute Zero".

Music
Punk band Peter and the Test Tube Babies formed in Peacehaven in 1978 and recall calling themselves the banchood group for a short period of time.

International relations

Twin towns
  Épinay-sous-Sénart, France
  Isernhagen, Germany

References

External links

  Gravitate Agency  (formerly GreenerPages )| Local community directory and BN10 business development website
 History of Peacehaven
 Peacehaven Town Council
 Peacehaven Chamber of Commerce
 Photographs of Peacehaven
 www.peacehaven.co.uk

Populated places established in 1916
Towns in East Sussex
Civil parishes in East Sussex
Populated coastal places in East Sussex
1916 establishments in England